Trifolium suffocatum, the suffocated clover, is a species of annual herb in the family Fabaceae. They have a self-supporting growth form and compound, broad leaves. Individuals can grow to 4.2 cm.

Sources

References 

suffocatum
Flora of Malta